Thomas Rowland (born 1945) is a former American football player and coach. He served as the head football coach at Illinois College from 1998 to 2002.
He was a member of the Green Bay Packers offseason squad in 1968.

References

1945 births
Living people
American football cornerbacks
Green Bay Packers players
Illinois College Blueboys football coaches
Illinois College Blueboys football players